A dreamcatcher is a Native American cultural object.

Dreamcatcher or Dream Catcher may also refer to:

People and characters
 The Dreamcatcher, nom de guerre of Gegard Mousasi, a Dutch mixed martial arts fighter
 Dreamcatcher, a Skylanders: Trap Team villain

Places
 Dreamcatcher, Cacodemon boulder, Squamish, B.C., Canada; a  climbing route first ascended by Chris Sharma
 Dreamcatcher (roller coaster), a rollercoaster in Bobbejaanland of Belgium

Businesses and organizations
 Dreamcatcher Company, a South Korean entertainment company
 DreamCatcher Interactive, a Canadian video game publisher
 Dreamcatcher Broadcasting, a U.S. broadcasting company
 The Dreamcatcher Foundation, a Chicago-based U.S. non-profit

Arts and entertainment

Film
 Dreamcatcher (2003 film), based on the Stephen King novel
 Dreamcatcher (2015 film), a 2015 documentary about prostitution
 Dreamcatcher (2021 film), a 2021 horror
 The Dream Catcher, a 1999 independent drama directed by Edward Radtke

Television
 Dreamcatchers, a travel documentary TV series
 The Dream Catchers, a TV series produced by Singapore's Chinese-language channel MediaCorp Channel 8
 "Dreamcatcher" (Once Upon a Time), an episode from the fifth season of the TV series Once Upon a Time
 "Dream Catcher" (Star Trek: Prodigy), a 2021 episode of Star Trek: Prodigy

Music
 Dreamcatcher (group), a South Korean pop group

Albums
 Dreamcatcher (Ian Gillan album), 1997
 Dreamcatcher (Last  Autumn's Dream album), 2008
 Dreamcatcher (Andy McKee album), 2004
 Dreamcatcher (Secret Garden album), 2000
 Dreamcatcher (David Lowe album), 1997
 Dreamcatcher, an album by Mark Medlock and Dieter Bohlen, 2007

Songs
"Dreamcatcher", a 2001 song by Secret Garden from the eponymous album Dreamcatcher
"Dream Catcher" (The Word Alive song), a 2010 song by The Word Alive from Deceiver
"Dreamcatcher", a 2014 song by Erra from the EP Moments of Clarity
"Dreamcatcher", a 2015 song by Dreamcatcher from the album The Sign
"Dreamcatcher" (Metro Boomin song), a 2018 song by Metro Boomin from the album Not All Heroes Wear Capes
"Dreamcatcher" (LP song), a 2018 song by LP from Heart to Mouth
"Dreamcatcher" (GFriend song), a 2020 song by GFriend from Labyrinth

Literature
 Dreamcatcher (novel), a 2001 novel by Stephen King
 The Dream Catcher (novel), a 1986 children's novel by Monica Hughes

Other media
 Spirit Catcher, also called Dream Catcher, a sculpture by Ron Baird
 Dream Catchers, an overnight program of soft music and short stories on SiriusXM's Kids Place Live

See also

 Dream Catcher Express, a fall leaves colour change tourism train service
 Dream (disambiguation)
 Catcher (disambiguation)